The Magdeburg Telemann Festival has been held biennially in Magdeburg since 1990 in honour of Georg Philipp Telemann, usually around Telemann's birthday, the 14th of March.

The first Magdeburg Telemann Festival days were organized 1962, 1965, 1967, 1970, 1973, 1977, 1981, 1984, 1987, primarily under the Cultural Association of the GDR.

The 20th Magdeburger Telemann-Festtage in 2010 welcomed conductors associated with the revival of interest in Telemann's music including Reinhard Goebel, Hermann Max, Ludger Rémy, Michael Schneider, Gotthold Schwarz, as well as baritone Klaus Mertens, and gambist Hille Perl.

References

Further reading

External links
 

Music festivals established in 1990
Classical music festivals in Germany
Tourist attractions in Magdeburg
Music festivals established in 1962
Early music festivals
1962 establishments in East Germany
Biennial events
Georg Philipp Telemann